Decadiomus bahamicus is a species of lady beetle in the  family Coccinellidae. It is found in the Caribbean and Southern Florida.

References

Coccinellidae
Beetles described in 1899